The Hillcrest mine disaster, the worst coal mining disaster in Canadian history, occurred at Hillcrest, Alberta, in the Crowsnest Pass region, on June 19, 1914, 9:30 am.

The disaster was reported by several news outlets including the Calgary Herald as the world's third-worst mine disaster at the time, after the Fraterville Mine disaster and the Courrières mine disaster.

Explosion
The mine started operations at 7:00 a.m. on June 19, 1914. At approximately 9:30 a.m., an explosion ripped through the tunnels, up the slopes and burst from the entries of the mine. John Brown, the general manager of the mine, rushed to the fan room to reverse the suction of air, which would push depleted oxygen back into the mine in an attempt to save any survivors. Initial rescue efforts were hampered by the complete destruction of the one entrance to the mine.

Of the 237 men who entered the mine that day, only 48 were rescued, many of them suffering from the effects of toxic gases.

Aftermath
The accident had a profound effect on the town of Hillcrest Mines, which in 1914 had a population of about 1,000. A total of 189 workers died, about half of the mine's total workforce, which left 90 women widowed and about 250 children fatherless. Many of the victims were buried in a mass grave at the Hillcrest Cemetery. The Government of Alberta held an inquiry into the circumstances surrounding the explosion in 1915.

Condolences came from across the country, including a brief message from King George V, but the commencement of World War I soon overshadowed this event.

Of the 189 victims of the disaster, many were immigrants, including 43 from the Austro-Hungarian Empire, of whom an estimated 30 were Ukrainian by ethnic origin, including 6 from one village, Karliv (now Prutivka), Galicia.

Operations at Hillcrest mine continued until Hillcrest Collieries, the mine owners, went into liquidation in April 1938, and the mine was officially closed on December 2, 1939.

A monument to the Hillcrest mine disaster and the lives lost was placed at the Hillcrest Cemetery.

In 1990, Canadian folk-singer James Keelaghan recorded "Hillcrest Mine", one of his best-known songs. The disaster is also featured in the song "Coal Miner" (album Heads Is East, Tails Is West, 2014) by Joal Kamps, an Alberta-based Rocky Mountain folk-pop singer.

Other area mining accidents
On September 19, 1926, another explosion occurred in the Hillcrest mine when the mine was idle, killing two men.

Other explosions at other coal mines within the Crowsnest Pass region also caused deaths: 
Coal Creek, 1902 (128 men killed)
Michel, 1904 (7)
Coleman, 1907 (3)
Bellevue, 1910 (30)
Michel, 1916 (12)
Coal Creek, 1917 (34)
Coleman, 1926 (10)
Michel, 1938 (3)

References

External links
Anderson, Frank W. Canada's Worst Mine Disaster. Frontier Books, 1969.
The Hillcrest Mine Disaster National Film Board of Canada, 2006.
Hillcrest Mine Disaster
Unofficial Hillcrest Mine Disaster website
Commission Appointed for the Investigation and Enquiry into the Cause and Effect of the Hillcrest Mine Disaster. Report. In Alberta. Dept. of Public Works. Mines Branch. Annual Report, 1914. Edmonton: J.W. Jeffery, Government Printer, 1915. p. 160-169.

Coal mining disasters in Canada
Disasters in Alberta
Explosions in Canada
1914 mining disasters
1914 in Canada
Underground mines in Canada
Explosions in 1926
Coal mines in Canada
Mines in Alberta
Crowsnest Pass, Alberta
1914 in Alberta
1914 disasters in Canada
History of immigration to Canada
Ukrainian diaspora in Canada